Landstraße (Central Bavarian: Laundstrossn) is the 3rd municipal district of Vienna, Austria. It is near the center of Vienna and was established in the 19th century. Landstraße is a heavily populated urban area with many workers and residential homes. It has 89,834 inhabitants in an area of 7.42 km2 (2.9 sq miles). It has existed since about 1200 AD. In 1192, the English king Richard the Lionheart was captured in the Erdberg neighbourhood, after the unsuccessful Third Crusade.

The name Landstraße means "country road". To tourists, it is mostly known for the 18th-century castle and gardens of Belvedere, the residence of Eugene of Savoy, which today houses the Austrian Gallery. Another residence was built by the Russian envoy to Vienna, Count Razumovsky. A more recent point of interest is the Hundertwasserhaus block of flats (apartment block) designed in a dream-like style by the architect and painter Friedensreich Hundertwasser. Museums in Landstraße include the KunstHausWien ("Vienna art house", also designed by Hundertwasser) and the Museum of Art Fakes. The St. Marx Cemetery in Landstraße contains the grave of Wolfgang Amadeus Mozart.

Austrian Chancellor Metternich (1773–1859) once remarked, "The Balkans begin at the Rennweg", which was then a mere road in Landstraße, out of Vienna towards the east.

Geography
Landstraße District is located in the southeastern city center of Vienna. It has an area of 7.42 km2, or 1.8% of the city of Vienna. This district is in the middle of Vienna's municipal districts. For one of the "interior districts" the district has a comparatively high proportion of greenery. The district lies along several terraces of the Danube, where the Danube Canal forms the eastern and the Vienna River the northwestern border. In the south of the district, Laaer Berg borders Landstraße.

Sights

Notes

References
 "Wien - 3. Bezirk/Landstrasse", Wien.gv.at, 2008, webpage (15 subpages): Wien.gv.at-landstrasse (in German).

 
Districts of Vienna